Bârlad is a city in Vaslui County, Romania. It lies on the banks of the river Bârlad, which waters the high plains of Western Moldavia.

At Bârlad the railway from Iași diverges, one branch skirting the river Siret, the other skirting the Prut; both reunite at Galați. Along with a maze of narrow and winding streets, Bârlad features several notable modern buildings, including the hospital administered by the Saint Spiridion Foundation of Iași. In the vicinity of the city are the ruins of a Roman camp.

The city is the birthplace of Romanian Domnitor (Ruler) and diplomat Alexandru Ioan Cuza.

Etymology
Scholars continue to debate the origin of the city's name. The Hypatian Codex mentions a market town called Berlad, and some historians, influenced by a document Bogdan Petriceicu Hasdeu published in the 19th century, have tried to link this town and its inhabitants (variously considered Romanians, East Slavs or an amalgam) with the Moldavian Bârlad. Ioan Bogdan demonstrated that the Hasdeu document was false, thus invalidating the hypothesis. Like Siret and Suceava, the medieval town took its name from the adjacent river, but nothing more can be said for certain. Constantin Cihodaru linked the name, of possible Hungarian origin, to a Slavic word (berlo — "rod", "cottage" or birlo — "swamp"), to which was added the Hungarian suffix -d, also found, for example, in the names Cenad, Arad, Tușnad, and Tășnad. Supporting this notion is the historic presence of a significant Hungarian community, with traditions recalling the fight against the Tatars in the mid-14th century.

History
During World War II, Bârlad was captured on 24 August 1944 by Soviet troops of the 2nd Ukrainian Front during the Jassy–Kishinev Offensive.

Population

Natives

Constantin Aur
Martin Bercovici
Elena Bibescu
Mihail Cristodulo Cerchez
N. D. Cocea
Adi Cristian Colceru (David Deejay)
Alexandru Ioan Cuza
Anton Davidoglu
Cleante Davidoglu
Manolache Costache Epureanu
Elena Farago
Leonte Filipescu
Gheorghe Gheorghiu-Dej
Max Goldstein
Marcel Guguianu
Ernest Juvara
Valeriu Lazarov
Alexandru I. Philippide
Ștefan Procopiu
Andreea Răducan
Nicolae Tonitza
Ovidiu Tonița
Bogdan Zebega
George Tutoveanu

Education

Bârlad features a total number of 43 school units, of which 23 kindergartens, 12 primary and secondary schools, 5 high schools, one vocational school, one music and arts school, an orphanage for preschool children and one for school children.

All these units are subordinated to the Romanians Ministry of Education.

Education
Main high schools are:
Colegiul Național Gheorge Roșca Codreanu (Gheorghe Roșca Codreanu National College) - the only national college in Vaslui County; 
Liceul Teoretic Mihai Eminescu (Mihai Eminescu Theoretical High School); 
Grupul Școlar Industrial Alexandru Ioan Cuza (Alexandru Ioan Cuza Industrial High School); 
Liceul Tehnologic Petru Rareș (Petru Rares Technological High School);
 Liceul Pedagogic Ioan Popescu (Ioan Popescu Pedagogical High School).

International relations

Twin towns—Sister cities 
Bârlad is twinned with:

  Vergèze, France
  Konya, Turkey

Sport
"Rulmentul Bârlad" is the city's rugby team, currently playing in the first rugby league in Romania. One of the pioneers of rugby in Romania, the first team was created in 1956 under the name of "Constructorul", meaning "The Builder" in Romanian. "S.C. RULMENȚI S.A. Bârlad" was formed later on in 1962, competing in the first tier of the Romanian rugby division ever since. The team colours are white and blue.
Notable performances are the winning of the 1986 and 1987 F.R.R cup (Federația Română de Rugby - The Romanian Rugby Cup).

"Fepa '74 Bârlad" was the city's football team, changing its name to "F.C. Bârlad" shortly after. Its best performance was the promotion in the second tier of the Romanian Football Championship in the mid-1980s.

Football

FC Bârlad
Fepa 74 Bârlad
FC Rulmentul Bârlad

Rugby
Rulmentul Bârlad

Gymnastics
CSS Bârlad

Gallery

See also
 Shale gas in Romania

Notes

External links

  Bună Dimineața Bârlad - BDB News
  Bârlad City Hall site
  Bârlad city portal

 
Cities in Romania
Localities in Western Moldavia
Capitals of former Romanian counties
Populated places in Vaslui County